Hulihaidar is a village in the Gangavathi taluk of Koppal district in the Indian state of Karnataka. Hulihaidar lies on Karnataka State Highway 29 connecting Kanakagiri and Tavaragera.

Demographics
As of the 2001 India census, Hulihaidar had a population of 4,149 with 2,116 males and 2,033 females and 657 Households.

See also
Pura, Kushtagi
Tavaragera
Kanakagiri
Navali gangavathi
Gangavathi
Koppal

References

Villages in Koppal district